Glutamate dehydrogenase (NAD(P)+) (glutamic dehydrogenase, glutamate dehydrogenase [NAD(P)+]) is an enzyme with systematic name L-glutamate:NAD(P)+ oxidoreductase (deaminating). This enzyme catalyses the following chemical reaction

 L-glutamate + H2O + NAD(P)+  2-oxoglutarate + NH4+ + NAD(P)H + H+

References

External links 
 

EC 1.4.1